What Was Asked of Us: An Oral History of the Iraq War by the Soldiers Who Fought It is a 2006 book presenting the oral history of soldiers who participated in the Iraq War.  It was written by Trish Wood, an award-winning author who has been honoured by the Canadian Association of Journalists, among other organizations.  Its interviews are a qualitative approach to documenting the war.

External links
 

Books about the 2003 invasion of Iraq
2006 non-fiction books
History books about the United States
Books about military history
Oral history books
Iraq War books